is a scroll depicting seven out of the sixteen lesser hells presented in Kisekyō ("Sutra of the World Arising"). Six of the paintings are accompanied by text, which all begin with the phrase "There is yet another hell", following a description of what the sinners depicted did to end up in this particular hell.

The seven hells depicted are:
 the Hell of Excrement
 the Hell of Measures
 the Hell of the Iron Mortar
 the Hell of the Flaming Rooster
 the Hell of the Black Sand Cloud
 the Hell of Pus and Blood
 the Hell of Foxes and Wolves

It is considered likely that the scroll corresponds to the Paintings of the Six Paths, commissioned by Emperor Goshirakawa in the 12th century. This handscroll was preserved in Daishō-in in Higashiokubo, Tokyo until the Meiji period, when it came into the hands of the Hara family of Kanagawa, later ending up in the possession of the Japanese government.

The whole scroll

See also
Naraka (Buddhism)
List of National Treasures of Japan (paintings)

External links

Tokyo National Museum's page on the scrolls, with pictures and descriptions of the individual paintings

References

Buddhist paintings
Naraka
National Treasures of Japan
Japanese paintings
Paintings in the collection of the Nara National Museum
12th-century manuscripts
12th-century paintings